Colonel Rosa Klebb is a fictional character, the main antagonist in the James Bond 1957 novel and 1963 film From Russia with Love, in which she is played by Lotte Lenya. She was a Soviet counter-intelligence operative till she was discharged then joined SPECTRE.

Her name is a pun on the popular Soviet phrase for women's rights, khleb i rozy (Cyrillic: хлеб и розы), which in turn was a direct Russian translation of the internationally used labour union slogan "bread and roses".

Novel biography
Colonel Klebb is a high-ranking member of the feared Russian counter-intelligence agency SMERSH, where she serves as the supervisor of Department II (operations and executions). It is strongly implied in the novel that she is a lesbian; Ian Fleming believed the description of Klebb's sexual orientation allowed the reader to understand how she fits into the plot. She has a reputation for overseeing the interrogations of enemy agents in which, after torturing the target, she speaks to them in a warm and motherly tone to extract information. She started her career as an OGPU agent placed inside POUM during the Spanish Civil War. Her chief was Andreu Nin i Perez, whose mistress she supposedly was. It was later rumoured that it was she who killed him. She is 5 ft 4 inches (163 cm) tall and described as unattractive. She is in her late 40s.

Klebb is assigned by SMERSH leader General Grubozaboyschikov to spearhead an operation to get revenge on James Bond for his involvement in the deaths of three SMERSH operatives, Le Chiffre, Mr. Big and Hugo Drax. Teaming with Tov Kronsteen and Red Grant, Klebb sets a trap for Bond, enlisting a cipher clerk, Tatiana Romanova, to pretend to defect, claiming to fall in love with Bond. Once Bond takes the bait, Grant intends to kill him. This plan backfires, however, when Bond foils Grant's attempt to kill him, and now with information given to him by the now deceased Grant, Bond heads to Paris to confront Klebb.

Bond tracks Klebb to the hotel in Paris where she was to rendezvous with Grant at the conclusion of his mission. He finds her there dressed as a wealthy widow. After failing to kill him with a gun hidden in a telephone, she successfully poisons him by means of a fugu venom-laced blade hidden in her shoe; she is then captured by Bond's friend René Mathis, of the Deuxième Bureau. The novel ends when Bond collapses to the floor; Fleming had intended to end the series at that point with Bond's death. In the next novel, Dr. No, M reveals that Bond survived as a result of Mathis' timely intervention. He mentions that Klebb is dead, without providing any details.

Film biography

In the film, Klebb is depicted as the former SMERSH head who has defected to become a member of SPECTRE (Blofeld refers to her as "No. 3"). She uses Tev Kronsteen's (Vladek Sheybal) plans to obtain the Lektor, a decoding device that is of high value to MI6, and kill James Bond (Sean Connery). She manipulates Tatiana Romanova (Daniela Bianchi) into helping Bond steal the Lektor, and then sends Red Grant (Robert Shaw) to kill Bond and recover it. After Bond kills Grant and escapes to Venice with the Lektor, Blofeld confronts both Klebb and Kronsteen over who is responsible for the failure of the mission; the latter is executed, whilst Klebb is given one last chance to get Bond and the Lektor. Posing as a hotel maid, she attempts to take the Lektor; when she is caught, she points a .25 Beretta 418 pistol at Bond. Tatiana then distracts her, causing her to drop the Beretta, and Bond and Klebb fight. As in the novel, Klebb attempts to kick Bond with the poison-tipped shoe, but Bond blocks the attack with a chair. Tatiana then shoots Klebb with her own Beretta, killing her.

For the screen, Klebb's sexuality was made less obvious; a few hints remain throughout the film, such as her reaction to when SPECTRE henchman Morzeny (Walter Gotell) touches her arm at the SPECTRE Island training facility, and when she appraises Romanova's figure during their first meeting and touches her leg.

Legacy
Rosa Klebb was one of two inspirations (the other being Irma Bunt) for the character of Frau Farbissina from the Austin Powers series.

Rosa Klebb's shoe blade has been featured in other films. It is used by Jade Fox in Crouching Tiger, Hidden Dragon, Ichi in Ichi the Killer, James West in Wild Wild West, the Joker in The Dark Knight, Oleg Vasilyevich Orlov in Salt, and Gary "Eggsy" Unwin in Kingsman: The Secret Service. It was also referenced in the Family Guy episode "Mr. and Mrs. Stewie" and parodied in the Peter Sellers film The Pink Panther Strikes Again.

A pair of Rosa Klebb's shoes can also be seen in Q's underground headquarters in the 2002 Bond film Die Another Day, along with other historic gadgets from Bond films, marking the 40th anniversary of the series. It is also included in the video for Madonna's "Die Another Day", the title track of the film, in which two versions of Madonna fight and kill each other, and the "Good Madonna" uses her shoe blade to disarm the "Bad Madonna".

In the 2010 reimagining of the video game GoldenEye 007, the weapon that was named "Klobb" in the original game (originally named after designer Ken Lobb) has had its name changed to "Klebb". Klebb herself is also a playable character in the game's multiplayer component.

Reception 
Klebb was also included in a list of the top ten Bond villains by The Times in 2008. Lisa Funnell described her as one of "the most dangerous female villains of the decade".

Elisabeth Ladenson wrote that she is one of "two memorable lesbians" from Fleming's Bond novels (the other being Pussy Galore). Ladenson notes that Klebb's character, a butch and unattractive design, whom Fleming's himself characterized in the novel as "the oldest and ugliest whore in the world", can be seen as "dig at Iron Curtain femininity, the sort of joke that endured until recently in digs at Eastern European female athletes". She also notes that her portrayal in the novel is more feminine than in the film. Lastly, using Melanie Klein's object relations theory, Ladenson suggests that Klebb's can be seen as the "bad mother" type of associative character.

Lauren Spungen criticized the portrayal of homosexuality in the characters of Klebb and Galore, arguing that the "battle between heterosexuality and homosexuality" is a metaphor for the battle of "good and evil". Her unwanted advances of Bond's love interest, Tatiana Romanova and other characterization make Klebb "foreign and not relatable, allowing further dehumanization".

References

Bond villains
Female characters in literature
Female film villains
Female literary villains
Fictional colonels
Fictional lesbians
Fictional Russian people
Fictional Soviet people
From Russia with Love (film)
Literary characters introduced in 1957
Fictional female assassins
Fictional torturers
Action film villains
Fictional LGBT characters in literature
LGBT villains
Film supervillains